The 2019 Indiana 250 was a NASCAR Xfinity Series race held on September 7, 2019, at Indianapolis Motor Speedway in Speedway, Indiana. Contested over 100 laps on the  speedway, it was the 25th race of the 2019 NASCAR Xfinity Series season.

Background

Track

The Indianapolis Motor Speedway, located in Speedway, Indiana, (an enclave suburb of Indianapolis) in the United States, is the home of the Indianapolis 500 and the Brickyard 400.

Constructed in 1909, it is the original speedway, the first racing facility so named. It has a permanent seating capacity estimated at 235,000 with infield seating raising capacity to an approximate 400,000. It is the highest-capacity sports venue in the world.

Entry list

Practice

First practice

Final practice

Qualifying

Qualifying results

Race

Summary
Kyle Busch started on pole, with Joe Gibbs Racing teammates Brandon Jones and Christopher Bell following closely. Tyler Reddick and the trio separated themselves from the rest of the field. On lap 15, Austin Dillon stalled on the backstretch access road after pitting issues. Busch fell behind after having to pit twice as not all lug nuts were tight on the car. Bell took the lead on the restart, but David Starr blew an engine soon after and brought out the next caution. After the next round of stops, Jones inherited the lead and held off Busch and Austin Cindric to win Stage 1.

After the restart, Brandon Brown spun and brought out the caution again. Busch took the lead and led until lap 50, where Justin Allgaier began approaching quickly and finally passed him three laps later. Allgaier pulled away from Busch and won stage 2. He also traded the lead often with Busch after the restart. Reddick also joined the battle until the next caution, where Josh Williams and Justin Haley strategically took the lead on the restart. Reddick and Bell were able to pass them as they struggled with maintaining the lead.

Busch raced his way back to third, and Cindric and Jones made contact, resulting in Jones spinning with under 15 laps remaining. The final caution and red flag happened when Bell and Reddick started next to each other; Bell got loose and slid into Reddick, causing both to slam hard into the wall. After the cleanup, Busch and Allgaier started in the front. Busch quickly got ahead of Allgaier, but couldn't pull away, while Allgaier also couldn't catch up. Busch ultimately managed to hold off Allgaier and won the race, taking his 96th Xfinity series win.

Stage Results

Stage One
Laps: 30

Stage Two
Laps: 30

Final Stage Results

Stage Three
Laps: 40

References

NASCAR races at Indianapolis Motor Speedway
2019 in sports in Indiana
Indiana 250
2019 NASCAR Xfinity Series